Dysteleology, also known as the argument from poor design, is the philosophical view that existence has no telos - no final cause from purposeful design. 

Ernst Haeckel (1834-1919) invented and popularized the term dysteleology.

See also

References

External links

Causality
Metaphysical theories
Teleology